Tiridates II (flourished second half of the 2nd century - died 252), known in Armenian sources as Khosrov, was an Armenian Parthian Prince who served as a Roman Client King of Armenia. Tiridates II was the son and heir of the Armenian King Khosrov I.

Between 214 and 216, Tiridates II and his family were held in detention by the Romans which provoked a major uprising in Armenia against Rome. In 215, the Roman emperor Caracalla led the Roman army and invaded Armenia to end the uprising.

In 217 Khosrov I had died and Tiridates II succeeded his father as King of Armenia. Tiridates II was granted the Armenian crown by Caracalla. He was declared King of Armenia upon Caracalla's assassination (8 April 217).

Tiridates II ruled as King of Armenia from 217 until his death in 252. After the death of Caracalla, Macrinus became the new Roman emperor and Macrinus agreed to release Tiridates II's mother from Roman captivity. After the Battle of Nisibis in 217 between Rome and Parthia and the treaty that was then agreed, Tiridates II was restored to his Armenian throne and his rule over Armenia was officially recognised.

At an unknown date during his reign, there's the possibility that the Mamikonian family immigrated from Bactria to Armenia. Tiridates II was the first king of Armenia to persecute Christians.  This persecution continued under his successors.

War against Sassanid Empire

Partly due to his long reign, Tiridates II became one of the most powerful and most influential Armenian monarchs from the Arsacid dynasty. In 224, the Parthian Empire was destroyed. The last king, Artabanus V of Parthia, who was Tiridates II's paternal uncle, was killed by Ardashir I, the first king of the Sassanid Empire.

Between 226 and 228, after annexing Parthia, Ardashir I wanted to expand his Empire to include Armenia. After two years of conflict, the armies of the Romans, Scythians and the Kushans withdrew their support for Armenia. Tiridates II and his army were left alone to continue fighting against Ardashir I.

Tiridates II put up a stubborn resistance against Ardashir I and still was not defeated after ten years of fighting. After twelve years of fighting against Tiridates II, Ardashir I withdrew his army and left Armenia. Also Tiridates son, Khosrov participated in his father's military campaigns against Ardashir, who was alarmed by their victories.  Tiridates II's lengthy military conflict with Ardashir I highlighted the strength of Armenia during the rule of Tiridates II. Tiridates II died in 252 and was succeeded by Khosrov II of Armenia.

References

Sources
 
 
 
 

3rd-century kings of Armenia
Roman client kings of Armenia
252 deaths
2nd-century Armenian people
Arsacid kings of Armenia